State Route 332 (SR 332) is a west to east secondary highway in Knox County in the U.S. state of Tennessee.

The route is 14 miles (23 km) long.  Its western terminus is in Farragut, Tennessee at State Route 1 (Kingston Pike).  Its eastern terminus is in  Knoxville at Papermill Road and Interstate 40/75.  The highway is known as Concord Road from Farragut to Concord and as Northshore Drive from Concord to and through Knoxville.

Junction list

References

Tennessee Department of Transportation (24 January 2003). "State Highway and Interstate List 2003".

External links
Tennessee Department of Transportation

332
Transportation in Knox County, Tennessee